The Argentine Athletics Championships is an annual outdoor competition in the sport of athletics that is organised by the Argentine Athletics Confederation which serves as the national championship for Argentina. It was first held in 1920 as a men only event and women's events were added from 1939 onwards. Most of the winners have been Algerian nationals, though a small number of invited foreign athletes have won events at the competition. In the period 1956 to 1960 two national championships were held, one by the Argentine Athletics Confederation and the other by the Argentine Athletics Federation. These are distinguished as "C" and "F" in the below lists.

Men

100 metres
1960F: Luis Vienna
1960C: Jorge Caffa
1961: Pedro Blache
1962: Luis Vienna
1963: Germán Oliva
1964: Diego Soler
1965: Juan Carlos García
1966: Roberto Schaefer
1967: Roberto Schaefer
1968: Andrés Calonge
1969: Rubén Paulo
1970: Pedro Bassart
1971: Pedro Bassart
1972: Pedro Bassart
1973: Gustavo Dubarbier
1974: Pedro Bassart
1975: Gustavo Dubarbier
1976: Carlos Martínez
1977: Gustavo Dubarbier
1978: Gustavo Dubarbier
1979: Gustavo Dubarbier
1980: Gustavo Dubarbier
1981: Nicolás Duncan Glass
1982: Hugo Alzamora
1983: Oscar Barrionuevo
1984: Oscar Barrionuevo
1985: Oscar Barrionuevo
1986: Gerardo Meinardi
1987: Gabriel Somma
1988: Claudio Arcas
1989: Alexandros Terzian
1990: Alexandros Terzian
1991: Claudio Molocznik
1992: Guillermo Cacián
1993: Carlos Gats
1994: Carlos Gats
1995: Gabriel Simón
1996: Carlos Gats
1997: Carlos Gats
1998: Gabriel Simón
1999: Gabriel Simón
2000: Gabriel Simón
2001: Gabriel Simón
2002: Gabriel Simón
2003: Matías Usandivaras
2004: Matías Usandivaras
2005: Iván Altamirano
2006: Iván Altamirano

200 metres
1960F: Gerardo Bönnhoff
1960C: Jorge Caffa
1961: Raúl Zabala
1962: Luis Vienna
1963: Andrés Calonge
1964: Guillermo Vallanía
1965: Andrés Calonge
1966: Roberto Schaefer
1967: Eduardo Satoyama
1968: Andrés Calonge
1969: Rubén Paulo
1970: Andrés Calonge
1971: Pedro Bassart
1972: José Pérez Ferrería
1973: Carlos Bertotti
1974: Alfredo Milano
1975: Gustavo Dubarbier
1976: Gustavo Dubarbier
1977: Gustavo Dubarbier
1978: Carlos Gambetta
1979: Carlos Gambetta
1980: Eduardo Oscar de Brito
1981: Nicolás Duncan Glass
1982: Ernesto Braun
1983: Alfredo Muro
1984: Oscar Barrionuevo
1985: Oscar Barrionuevo
1986: Gerardo Meinardi
1987: Gabriel Somma
1988: Claudio Arcas
1989: Carlos Gats
1990: Alexandros Terzian
1991: José María Beduino
1992: Carlos Gats
1993: Carlos Gats
1994: Carlos Gats
1995: Guillermo Cacián
1996: Guillermo Cacián
1997: Carlos Gats
1998: Damián Spector
1999: Matías Fayos
2000: Nicolás Arias Duval
2001: Matías Fayos
2002: Matías Usandivaras
2003: Matías Usandivaras
2004: Matías Usandivaras
2005: Iván Altamirano
2006: Iván Altamirano

400 metres
1960F: Juan Carlos Dyrzka
1960C: Ricardo Turesso
1961: Raúl Zabala
1962: Juan Carlos Dyrzka
1963: Víctor Lozano
1964: Carlos Heuchert
1965: Andrés Calonge
1966: Alfredo Sánchez
1967: Juan Carlos Dyrzka
1968: Alfredo Sánchez
1969: Luis Amatti
1970: Andrés Calonge
1971: Carlos Heuchert
1972: Carlos Inchasti
1973: Carlos Bertotti
1974: Rubén Buscalia
1975: Raúl Ham
1976: Carlos Bertotti
1977: Juan Rodríguez
1978: Ángel Gagliano
1979: Ángel Gagliano
1980: Ángel Gagliano
1981: Ángel Gagliano
1982: Daniel Bambicha
1983: Daniel Bambicha
1984: José María Beduino
1985: Dardo Angerami
1986: José María Beduino
1987: Daniel Bambicha
1988: José María Beduino
1989: Nicolás Rodríguez
1990: Claudio Arcas
1991: Claudio Arcas
1992: Claudio Arcas
1993: Cristian Díaz
1994: Guillermo Cacián
1995: Guillermo Cacián
1996: Gustavo Aguirre
1997: Gustavo Aguirre
1998: Gustavo Aguirre
1999: Gustavo Aguirre
2000: Gustavo Aguirre
2001: Gustavo Aguirre
2002: Gustavo Aguirre
2003: Gustavo Aguirre
2004: Esteban Brandán
2005: Esteban Brandán
2006: Esteban Brandán

800 metres
1960F: Víctor Lozano
1960C: Norberto Perrone
1961: Víctor Lozano
1962: Víctor Lozano
1963: Víctor Lozano
1964: Guillermo Cuello
1965: Ricardo Antelo
1966: Guillermo Cuello
1967: Guillermo Cuello
1968: Mario Fabris
1969: Leandro Espínola
1970: Leandro Espínola
1971: Carlos Dalurzo
1972: Carlos Dalurzo
1973: Carlos Dalurzo
1974: Carlos Inchasti
1975: Carlos Villar
1976: Omar Amdematten
1977: Leandro Espínola
1978: Omar Amdematten
1979: Pedro Cáceres
1980: Raúl López
1981: Raúl López
1982: Raúl López
1983: Raúl López
1984: Luis Migueles
1985: Luis Migueles
1986: Luis Migueles
1987: Luis Migueles
1988: Luis Migueles
1989: Luis Migueles
1990: Leonardo Malgor
1991: Edgardo Graglia
1992: Luis Migueles
1993: Luis Migueles
1994: Gabriel López
1995: Víctor Matarresse
1996: Gabriel Guzmán
1997: Gabriel Guzmán
1998: Gabriel López
1999: Gustavo Aguirre
2000: Gustavo Aguirre
2001: Sebastián González Cabot
2002: Sebastián González Cabot
2003: Sebastián González Cabot
2004: Sebastián González Cabot
2005: Leonardo Price
2006: Matias Di Leva

1500 metres
1960F: Juan Carlos Ferriolo
1960C: Ángel Miranda
1961: Rodolfo Antelo
1962: Eduardo Balducci
1963: Domingo Amaizón
1964: Juan Carlos Ferriolo
1965: Domingo Amaizón
1966: Juan Carlos Ferriolo
1967: Ricardo Leguiza
1968: Domingo Amaizón
1969: Nazario Araújo
1970: Abel Córdoba
1971: Abel Córdoba
1972: Abel Córdoba
1973: Omar Amdematten
1974: Leandro Espínola
1975: Carlos Villar
1976: Carlos Villar
1977: Leandro Espinola
1978: Omar Amdematten
1979: Omar Amdematten
1980: Alexis Abot
1981: Pedro Cáceres
1982: Omar Amdematten
1983: Marcos González
1984: Luis Migueles
1985: Luis Migueles
1986: Marcelo Cascabelo
1987: Antonio Silio
1988: Marcelo Cascabelo
1989: Carlos Naput
1990: Leonardo Malgor
1991: Alejandro Torres
1992: Leonardo Malgor
1993: Leonardo Malgor
1994: Leonardo Malgor
1995: Gustavo Romero
1996: Gabriel Chandía
1997: Juan José Cruz
1998: Julián Peralta
1999: Gabriel López
2000: Javier Carriqueo
2001: Sebastián González Cabot
2002: Javier Carriqueo
2003: Sebastián González Cabot
2004: Sebastián González Cabot
2005: Javier Carriqueo
2006: Leonardo Price

3000 metres
1960C: Dionisio Bustos
1961: Rafael Garrone

5000 metres
1960F: Domingo Amaizón
1960C: Dionisio Bustos
1961: Mario Cutropia
1962: Osvaldo Suárez
1963: Osvaldo Suárez
1964: Mario Cutropia
1965: Mario Cutropia
1966: Domingo Amaizón
1967: Alberto Ríos
1968: Domingo Amaizón
1969: Carlos Loto
1970: Domingo Amaizón
1971: Domingo Amaizón
1972: Domingo Amaizón
1973: Domingo Amaizón
1974: Albino Saldivia
1975: Mario Fernández
1976: Juan Adolfo Carrizo
1977: Norberto Limonta
1978: Norberto Limonta
1979: Norberto Limonta
1980: Jorge Monín
1981: Fernando Marrón
1982: Carlos Castro
1983: Julio César Gómez
1984: Juan Pablo Juárez
1985: Juan Pablo Juárez
1986: Juan Pablo Juárez
1987: Antonio Silio
1988: Antonio Silio
1989: Antonio Silio
1990: Oscar Raimo
1991: Antonio Ibáñez
1992: Oscar Amaya
1993: Antonio Ibáñez
1994: Daniel Castro
1995: Oscar Amaya
1996: Gabriel Chandía
1997: Oscar Amaya
1998: Iván Noms
1999: Ramiro Paris
2000: Javier Carriqueo
2001: Julián Peralta
2002: Javier Carriqueo
2003: José Mansilla
2004: César Troncoso
2005: Cristian Alfonsín
2006: Javier Carriqueo

10,000 metres
1960F: Domingo Amaizón
1960C: Dionisio Bustos
1961: José Díaz
1962: Osvaldo Suárez
1963: Osvaldo Suárez
1964: Mario Cutropia
1965: Mario Cutropia
1966: Nazario Araújo
1967: Ricardo Leguiza
1968: Domingo Amaizón
1969: Osvaldo Suárez
1970: Domingo Amaizón
1971: Juan Adolfo Carrizo
1972: Domingo Amaizón
1973: Domingo Amaizón
1974: Carlos Agüero
1975: Albino Saldivia
1976: Juan Adolfo Carrizo
1977: Luis Esterio
1978: Norberto Limonta
1979: Raúl Suárez
1980: Jorge Monín
1981: Julio Walter Ruiz
1982: Juan Adolfo Carrizo
1983: Juan Pablo Juárez
1984: Juan Pablo Juárez
1985: Juan Pablo Juárez
1986: Juan Pablo Juárez
1987: Juan Pablo Juárez
1988: Antonio Silio
1989: Marcelo Cascabelo
1990: Jorge Sosa
1991: Oscar Amaya
1992: Oscar Raimo
1993: Oscar Amaya
1994: Antonio Silio
1995: 
1996: 
1997: Oscar Raimo
1998: José Montenegro
1999: 
2000: José Mansilla
2001: Oscar Amaya
2002: José Mansilla
2003: Juan Suárez
2004: Ulises Sanguinetti
2005: Juan Suárez
2006: Sergio Lencina

10K run
1989: Juan Pablo Juárez

15K run
The 1990 championship was held on a short course.
1990: Tranquilino Valenzuela
1991: Carlos Naput

Half marathon
The 1995 championship was held on a short course.
1994: Tranquilino Valenzuela
1995: José Andrada
1996: Juan Pablo Juárez
1997: Juan Pablo Juárez
1998: Oscar Amaya
1999: Gustavo Romero
2000: Oscar Cortínez
2001: Antonio Silio
2002: Oscar Cortínez
2003: Oscar Cortínez
2004: Gustavo Comba
2005: Gastón Fuentealba

Marathon
The 1972 championship was held on a short course.
1972: Nazario Araújo
1973: Alberto Ríos
1974: Alberto Ríos
1975: Possibly not held
1976: Possibly not held
1977: Raimundo Manquel
1978: Possibly not held
1979: Raúl Llusa
1980: Alfredo Maravilla
1981: Raúl Suárez
1982: Alfredo Maravilla
1983: Carlos Orué
1984: Rubén Aguiar
1985: José Orué
1986: Juan Ríos
1987: Rubén Aguiar
1988: Toribio Gutiérrez
1989: Toribio Gutiérrez
1990: Carlos Edgar Barría
1991: Carlos Edgar Barría
1992: Toribio Gutiérrez
1993: Tranquilino Valenzuela
1994: Toribio Gutiérrez
1995: Carlos Edgar Barría
1996: Juan Pablo Juárez
1997: Toribio Gutiérrez
1998: Oscar Alarcón
1999: Oscar Cortínez
2000: Juan Castro
2001: Claudio Burgos
2002: Alejandro Giménez
2003: Daniel Simbrón
2004: Daniel Simbrón
2005: Oscar Cortínez

3000 metres steeplechase
1960F: Carlos Ricci
1960C: Not held
1961: Possibly not held
1962: Alberto Ríos
1963: Domingo Amaizón
1964: Antonio Artaza
1965: Domingo Amaizón
1966: Antonio Artaza
1967: Carlos Loto
1968: Domingo Amaizón
1969: Carlos Loto
1970: Carlos Loto
1971: Domingo Amaizón
1972: Abel Córdoba
1973: Domingo Amaizón
1974: Héctor Córdoba
1975: Abel Córdoba
1976: Domingo Amaizón
1977: Abel Córdoba
1978: Raimundo Manquel
1979: Norberto Limonta
1980: Abel Córdoba
1981: Claudio Herrero
1982: Diego Zarba
1983: Marcelo Cascabelo
1984: Marcelo Cascabelo
1985: Marcelo Cascabelo
1986: Marcelo Cascabelo
1987: Carlos Naput
1988: Marcelo Cascabelo
1989: Oscar Amaya
1990: Oscar Amaya
1991: Carlos Naput
1992: Ramiro Paris
1993: Mariano Tarilo
1994: Antonio Soliz
1995: Antonio Soliz
1996: Ramiro Paris
1997: Julián Peralta
1998: Mariano Tarilo
1999: Mariano Tarilo
2000: Mariano Tarilo
2001: Mariano Tarilo
2002: Esteban Coria
2003: Mariano Mastromarino
2004: Mariano Mastromarino
2005: Mariano Mastromarino
2006: Mariano Mastromarino

110 metres hurdles
1960F: Juan Carlos Dyrzka
1960C: Jorge Rico
1961: Guillermo Vallanía
1962: Juan Carlos Dyrzka
1963: Guillermo Vallanía
1964: Guillermo Vallanía
1965: Raúl Domínguez
1966: Juan Carlos Dyrzka
1967: Juan Carlos Dyrzka
1968: Miguel Perotti
1969: Juan Carlos Dyrzka
1970: Marcelo Tiberi
1971: Francisco Rosetto
1972: Francisco Rosetto
1973: Francisco Rosetto
1974: Hugo Tanino
1975: Tito Steiner
1976: Rodolfo Iturraspe
1977: Rodolfo Iturraspe
1978: Guillermo Gago
1979: Pablo Bianchi
1980: Rodolfo Iturraspe
1981: Rodolfo Iturraspe
1982: Javier Olivar
1983: Carlos Varas
1984: Carlos Varas
1985: Carlos Varas
1986: Carlos Varas
1987: Carlos Varas
1988: Carlos McGarry
1989: Carlos McGarry
1990: Diego Mur
1991: Oscar Ratto
1992: Oscar Ratto
1993: Ricardo D'Andrilli
1994: Oscar Ratto
1995: Oscar Ratto
1996: Oscar Ratto
1997: Oscar Ratto
1998: Pablo Ribone
1999: Oscar Ratto
2000: Oscar Ratto
2001: Oscar Ratto
2002: Diego Morán
2003: Leandro Peyrano
2004: Leandro Peyrano
2005: Leandro Peyrano
2006: Leandro Peyrano

400 metres hurdles
1960F: Juan Carlos Dyrzka
1960C: Jorge Rico
1961: Osvaldo Fernández
1962: Juan Carlos Dyrzka
1963: Juan Mazza
1964: Juan Mazza
1965: Mario Mazza
1966: Juan Carlos Dyrzka
1967: Juan Carlos Dyrzka
1968: Alfredo Sánchez
1969: Juan Carlos Dyrzka
1970: Marcelo Tiberi
1971: Rubén Paulo
1972: Marcelo Tiberi
1973: Roberto Comisso
1974: Hugo Tanino
1975: Hugo Tanino
1976: Guillermo Gago
1977: Guillermo Gago
1978: Guillermo Gago
1979: Guillermo Gago
1980: Jorge Barrera
1981: Jorge Díaz
1982: Jorge Díaz
1983: Jorge Díaz
1984: Jorge Díaz
1985: Jorge Díaz
1986: Dardo Angerami
1987: Fernando Marzano
1988: Fernando Marzano
1989: Dardo Angerami
1990: Miguel Pérez
1991: Dardo Angerami
1992: Miguel Pérez
1993: Miguel Pérez
1994: Gabriel Corradini
1995: Miguel Pérez
1996: Miguel Pérez
1997: Miguel Pérez
1998: Santiago Lorenzo
1999: Gabriel Heredia
2000: Gabriel Heredia
2001: Gabriel Heredia
2002: Facundo Aranguren
2003: José Pignataro
2004: Sebastián Lasquera
2005: Christian Deymonnaz
2006: José Pignataro

High jump
1960F: Eleuterio Fassi
1960C: Felipe Ramos
1961: Horacio Del Sel
1962: Horacio Del Sel
1963: Eleuterio Fassi
1964: Roberto Pozzi
1965: Julio Ibarreche
1966: Eleuterio Fassi
1967: Roberto Pozzi
1968: Roberto Pozzi
1969: Hugo Castello
1970: Rafael Albarracín
1971: José Dalmastro
1972: Luis Barrionuevo
1973: Luis Barrionuevo
1974: Rafael Albarracín
1975: Daniel Mamet
1976: Claudio Lippi
1977: Luis Barrionuevo
1978: Daniel Mamet
1979: Daniel Mamet
1980: Fernando Pastoriza
1981: Oscar Baronetto
1982: Carlos Gambetta
1983: Fernando Pastoriza
1984: Fernando Pastoriza
1985: Fernando Pastoriza
1986: Fernando Pastoriza
1987: Fernando Pastoriza
1988: Fernando Moreno
1989: Fernando Pastoriza
1990: Fernando Moreno
1991: Fernando Moreno
1992: Fernando Moreno
1993: Fernando Moreno
1994: Erasmo Jara
1995: Erasmo Jara
1996: Erasmo Jara
1997: Erasmo Jara
1998: Erasmo Jara
1999: Erasmo Jara
2000: Erasmo Jara
2001: Erasmo Jara
2002: Erasmo Jara
2003: Erasmo Jara
2004: Leandro Piedrabuena
2005: Erasmo Jara
2006: Santiago Guerci

Pole vault
1960F: Mario Eleusippi
1960C: Dante Beltrán
1961: Ricardo Bonini
1962: Mario Eleusippi
1963: Juan Carballo
1964: Hugo Argat
1965: Erico Barney
1966: Erico Barney
1967: Erico Barney
1968: Bienvenido Dell'Aica
1969: Daniel Argoitía
1970: José Taddeo
1971: Bienvenido Dell'Aica
1972: Bienvenido Dell'Aica
1973: Bienvenido Dell'Aica
1974: Felix Woelflin
1975: Guillermo Chiaraviglio
1976: Guillermo Chiaraviglio
1977: Guillermo Meyer
1978: Daniel Thorne
1979: Guillermo Chiaraviglio
1980: Daniel Thorne
1981: Guillermo Chiaraviglio
1982: Guillermo Chiaraviglio
1983: Oscar Veit
1984: Oscar Veit
1985: Walter Franzantti
1986: Oscar Veit
1987: Oscar Veit
1988: Oscar Veit
1989: Oscar Veit
1990: Oscar Veit
1991: Fernando Pastoriza
1992: Oscar Veit
1993: Oscar Veit
1994: Oscar Veit
1995: Oscar Veit
1996: Fernando Pastoriza
1997: Oscar Veit
1998: Javier Benítez
1999: Javier Benítez
2000: Javier Benítez
2001: Javier Benítez
2002: Javier Benítez
2003: Javier Benítez
2004: Germán Chiaraviglio
2005: Javier Benítez
2006: Germán Chiaraviglio

Long jump
1960F: Ricardo Nicoli
1960C: Jorge Caffa
1961: Jorge Castillo
1962: Jorge Castillo
1963: Alfredo Boncagni
1964: Alfredo Boncagni
1965: Héctor Rivas
1966: Alfredo Boncagni
1967: Alfredo Boncagni
1968: Alfredo Boncagni
1969: Alfredo Boncagni
1970: Eduardo Labalta
1971: Eduardo Labalta
1972: Eduardo Labalta
1973: Emilio Mazzeo
1974: Ariel González
1975: Emilio Mazzeo
1976: Hugo Meriano
1977: Emilio Mazzeo
1978: Alfredo Boncagni
1979: Eduardo Labalta
1980: Ángel Gagliano
1981: Carlos Gambetta
1982: Carlos Gambetta
1983: Eduardo Labalta
1984: Osvaldo Frigerio
1985: Sergio Roh
1986: Osvaldo Frigerio
1987: Marcelo Miño
1988: Alejandro Gats
1989: Oscar Veit
1990: Alejandro Gats
1991: Martín Gallino
1992: Néstor Madrid
1993: Oscar Veit
1994: Néstor Madrid
1995: Pablo Silva
1996: Diego Vázquez
1997: Pablo Silva
1998: Leandro Simes
1999: Leandro Simes
2000: Mariano Sala
2001: Diego Suárez
2002: Eric Kerwitz
2003: Eric Kerwitz
2004: Eric Kerwitz
2005: Eric Kerwitz
2006: Eric Kerwitz

Triple jump
1960F: Raúl Castagnino
1960C: Arturo Arancibia
1961: Jorge Castillo
1962: Julio Ibarreche
1963: Mario Medrano
1964: Jorge Castillo
1965: Jorge Vuelta
1966: Hugo Tombolini
1967: Hugo Tombolini
1968: Enrique Casco
1969: Ariel González
1970: Ángel Gagliano
1971: Masaya Higa
1972: Masaya Higa
1973: Emilio Mazzeo
1974: Emilio Mazzeo
1975: Ángel Gagliano
1976: Emilio Mazzeo
1977: Ángel Gagliano
1978: Ángel Gagliano
1979: Ángel Gagliano
1980: Ángel Gagliano
1981: Jorge Mazzeo
1982: Jorge Mazzeo
1983: Ángel Gagliano
1984: Fabián Plajta
1985: Ángel Gagliano
1986: Ángel Gagliano
1987: Néstor Alaniz
1988: Alejandro Gats
1989: Fabián Di Leo
1990: Alejandro Gats
1991: Fabián Di Leo
1992: Fernando Pecchenino
1993: Fernando Pecchenino
1994: Juan Carlos Chávez
1995: Pablo Macías
1996: Pablo Macías
1997: Alejandro Gats
1998: Leandro Simes
1999: Pablo Macías
2000: Mariano Sala
2001: Leandro Simes
2002: Mariano Sala
2003: Mariano Sala
2004: Marcelo Pichipil
2005: Martin Falico
2006: Gustavo Ochoa

Shot put
1960F: Enrique Helf
1960C: Roque Eguillor
1961: Enrique Helf
1962: Enrique Helf
1963: Luis Di Cursi
1964: Luis Di Cursi
1965: Mario Peretti
1966: Enrique Pilarche
1967: Mario Peretti
1968: Mario Peretti
1969: Juan Adolfo Turri
1970: Juan Adolfo Turri
1971: Mario Peretti
1972: Juan Adolfo Turri
1973: Juan Adolfo Turri
1974: Juan Adolfo Turri
1975: Juan Adolfo Turri
1976: José Vallejo
1977: Néstor Sánchez
1978: Tito Steiner
1979: Néstor Sánchez
1980: Gerardo Carucci
1981: Juan Adolfo Turri
1982: Gerardo Carucci
1983: Gerardo Carucci
1984: Gerardo Carucci
1985: Gerardo Carucci
1986: Gerardo Carucci
1987: Gerardo Carucci
1988: Gerardo Carucci
1989: Marcelo Pugliese
1990: Andrés Charadía
1991: Andrés Charadía
1992: Adrián Marzo
1993: Adrián Marzo
1994: Adrián Marzo
1995: Adrián Marzo
1996: Adrián Marzo
1997: Marcelo Pugliese
1998: Adrián Marzo
1999: Francisco Pinter
2000: Adrián Marzo
2001: Andrés Calvo
2002: Adrián Marzo
2003: Adrián Marzo
2004: Adrián Marzo
2005: Germán Lauro
2006: Germán Lauro

Discus throw
1960F: Günther Kruse
1960C: Roque Eguillor
1961: Enrique Helf
1962: Enrique Helf
1963: Luis Di Cursi
1964: Luis Di Cursi
1965: Mario Peretti
1966: Juan Báez
1967: Mario Peretti
1968: Hugo Bassetti
1969: Enrique Di Paolo
1970: Esteban Drapich
1971: Mario Peretti
1972: Hugo Bassetti
1973: Esteban Drapich
1974: José Vallejo
1975: Juan Adolfo Turri
1976: Hugo Bassetti
1977: Héctor Rivero
1978: Héctor Rivero
1979: José Vallejo
1980: Ubaldo Oscar Peñalba
1981: Norberto Aimé
1982: Carlos Brynner
1983: Carlos Brynner
1984: Antonio da Cunha
1985: Carlos Brynner
1986: Gerardo Carucci
1987: Gerardo Carucci
1988: Marcelo Pugliese
1989: Marcelo Pugliese
1990: Andrés Charadía
1991: Marcelo Pugliese
1992: Marcelo Pugliese
1993: Marcelo Pugliese
1994: Marcelo Pugliese
1995: Marcelo Pugliese
1996: Marcelo Pugliese
1997: Marcelo Pugliese
1998: Marcelo Pugliese
1999: Marcelo Pugliese
2000: Marcelo Pugliese
2001: Marcelo Pugliese
2002: Marcelo Pugliese
2003: Marcelo Pugliese
2004: Jorge Balliengo
2005: Jorge Balliengo
2006: Jorge Balliengo

Hammer throw
1960F: Hugo Watle
1960C: Jorge Lucero
1961: Carlos Marzo
1962: José Vallejo
1963: José Vallejo
1964: Alberto Corvatta
1965: Alberto Corvatta
1966: José Vallejo
1967: Alberto Corvatta
1968: José Vallejo
1969: Carlos Gatica
1970: José Vallejo
1971: José Vallejo
1972: José Vallejo
1973: José Vallejo
1974: José Vallejo
1975: José Vallejo
1976: José Vallejo
1977: Daniel Gómez
1978: José Vallejo
1979: José Vallejo
1980: Daniel Gómez
1981: Ernesto Iglesias
1982: Daniel Gómez
1983: Roberto Olcese
1984: Daniel Gómez
1985: Daniel Gómez
1986: Andrés Charadía
1987: Andrés Charadía
1988: Andrés Charadía
1989: Andrés Charadía
1990: Andrés Charadía
1991: Andrés Charadía
1992: Andrés Charadía
1993: Andrés Charadía
1994: Andrés Charadía
1995: Juan Ignacio Cerra
1996: Adrián Marzo
1997: Juan Ignacio Cerra
1998: Adrián Marzo
1999: Juan Ignacio Cerra
2000: Juan Ignacio Cerra
2001: Adrián Marzo
2002: Adrián Marzo
2003: Juan Ignacio Cerra
2004: Juan Ignacio Cerra
2005: Juan Ignacio Cerra
2006: Juan Ignacio Cerra

Javelin throw
1960F: Ricardo Héber
1960C: C. Santillán
1961: Antolín Rodríguez
1962: Ricardo Héber
1963: Antolín Rodríguez
1964: Ian Barney
1965: Oscar Bustamante
1966: Ian Barney
1967: Rafael Difonzo
1968: Máximo Gromik
1969: Ricardo Héber
1970: Néstor Pietrobelli
1971: Ricardo Héber
1972: Rolf Bühler
1973: Dante Bertorello
1974: Néstor Pietrobelli
1975: Ramón Ángel Garmendia
1976: Ramón Ángel Garmendia
1977: Ramón Ángel Garmendia
1978: Ramón Ángel Garmendia
1979: Ramón Ángel Garmendia
1980: Ramón Ángel Garmendia
1981: Ramón Ángel Garmendia
1982: Juan Garmendia
1983: Juan Garmendia
1984: Jesús López Ordaz
1985: Jesús López Ordaz
1986: Walter Franzantti
1987: Juan Garmendia
1988: Juan Garmendia
1989: Juan Garmendia
1990: Alan Dashwood
1991: Alan Dashwood
1992: Juan Garmendia
1993: Juan Garmendia
1994: Mauricio Silva
1995: Néstor Giménez
1996: Mauricio Silva
1997: Néstor Giménez
1998: Mauricio Silva
1999: Mauricio Silva
2000: Pablo Pietrobelli
2001: Pablo Pietrobelli
2002: Pablo Pietrobelli
2003: Pablo Pietrobelli
2004: Alejandro Ionsky
2005: Pablo Pietrobelli
2006: Pablo Pietrobelli

Decathlon
The 1980 decathlon had an irregular standard in the shot put.
1960F: Antonio Hiebra
1960C: Not held
1961: Rubén Salvatori
1962: Oscar Bártoli
1963: Héctor Rivas
1964: Héctor Rivas
1965: Julio Ibarreche
1966: Juan Carlos Kerwitz
1967: Juan Carlos Kerwitz
1968: Juan Carlos Kerwitz
1969: Ariel González
1970: Emilio Mazzeo
1971: Emilio Mazzeo
1972: Tito Steiner
1973: Tito Steiner
1974: Alberto Fernández
1975: Roberto Steinmetz
1976: Tito Steiner
1977: Sergio Mastrovic
1978: Tito Steiner
1979: Guillermo Chiaraviglio
1980: Hugo Giménez
1981: Hugo Giménez
1982: Hugo Giménez
1983: Carlos Martín
1984: Carlos Martín
1985: Carlos Martín
1986: Possibly not held
1987: Martín Badano
1988: Martín Badano
1989: Oscar Veit
1990: Fernando Fondello
1991: Rodrigo Retamal
1992: Fabio Suárez
1993: Gustavo Occhiuzzo
1994: Diego Kerwitz
1995: Diego Kerwitz
1996: Diego Kerwitz
1997: Santiago Lorenzo
1998: Diego Kerwitz
1999: Enrique Aguirre
2000: Enrique Aguirre
2001: Eric Kerwitz
2002: Enrique Aguirre
2003: Enrique Aguirre
2004: Enrique Aguirre
2005: Leandro Peyrano
2006: Enrique Aguirre

20,000 metres walk
1992: Juan Ingrata
1993: Benjamín Loréfice
1994: José Aguilera
1995: Jorge Loréfice
1996: Not held
1997: Jorge Loréfice
1998: Jorge Loréfice
1999: Jorge Loréfice
2000: Jorge Loréfice
2001: Not held
2002: Not held
2003: Jorge Yannone

20 kilometres walk
1980: Jorge Lannone
1981: Possibly not held
1982: Possibly not held
1983: Possibly not held
1984: Possibly not held
1985: Possibly not held
1986: Jorge Lannone
1987: Jorge Lannone
1988: Fernando Laterza
1989: Jorge Loréfice
1990: Jorge Loréfice
1991: Benjamín Loréfice
1992: Possibly not held
1993: Possibly not held
1994: Possibly not held
1995: Possibly not held
1996: Jorge Loréfice
1997: Possibly not held
1998: Possibly not held
1999: Possibly not held
2000: Possibly not held
2001: Jorge Loréfice
2002: Claudio Carrizo
2003: Jorge Loréfice
2004: Jorge Loréfice
2005: Jorge Loréfice
2006: Hernán Calderón

Cross country (long course)
1971: Domingo Amaizón
1972: Abel Córdoba
1973: Abel Córdoba
1974: Domingo Amaizón
1975: Heraldo Cuevas
1976: Not held
1977: Not held
1978: Not held
1979: Not held
1980: Alfredo Maravilla
1981: Jorge Monín
1982: Ramón Busquet
1983: Luis Esterio
1984: Fernando Marrón
1985: Aldo Pérez
1986: Julio César Gómez
1987: Carlos Pérez
1988: Antonio Silio
1989: Antonio Silio
1990: Carlos Umpiérrez
1991: Oscar Amaya
1992: Leonardo Malgor
1993: Juan Pablo Juárez
1994: Tranquilino Valenzuela
1995: Carlos Umpiérrez
1996: Tranquilino Valenzuela
1997: Zenón Patiño
1998: Iván Noms
1999: José Montenegro
2000: Oscar Amaya
2001: Ricardo Franzón
2002: Daniel Castro
2003: Oscar Amaya
2004: Daniel Castro
2005: Oscar Cortínez

Cross country (short course)
1999: Oscar Raimo
2000: José Mansilla
2001: Julián Peralta
2002: Gustavo Romero
2003: César Troncoso
2004: Ulises Sanguinetti
2005: Ulises Sanguinetti

Women

100 metres
1960F: Mabel Farina
1960C: Alba Balocco
1961: Marta Buongiorno
1962: Margarita Formeiro
1963: Margarita Formeiro
1964: Cristina Irurzun
1965: Margarita Formeiro
1966: Cristina Irurzun
1967: Alicia Kaufmanas
1968: Alicia Kaufmanas
1969: Irene Fitzner
1970: Elba Martín
1971: Liliana Cragno
1972: Liliana Cragno
1973: Liliana Cragno
1974: Belkis Fava
1975: Beatriz Allocco
1976: Beatriz Allocco
1977: Beatriz Allocco
1978: Beatriz Allocco
1979: Belkis Fava
1980: Adriana Pero
1981: Marisol Besada
1982: Adriana Pero
1983: Andrea Barabino
1984: Mirta Forgione
1985: Deborah Bell
1986: Deborah Bell
1987: Deborah Bell
1988: Laura de Falco
1989: Ana María Comaschi
1990: Denise Sharpe
1991: Anabella von Kesselstatt
1992: Ana María Comaschi
1993: Daniela Lebreo
1994: Daniela Lebreo
1995: Olga Conte
1996: Olga Conte
1997: Olga Conte
1998: Vanesa Vallejos
1999: Verónica Depaoli
2000: Vanesa Wohlgemuth
2001: Vanesa Wohlgemuth
2002: Vanesa Wohlgemuth
2003: Vanesa Wohlgemuth
2004: Vanesa Wohlgemuth
2005: Vanesa Wohlgemuth
2006: Liliana Tantucci

200 metres
1960F: Ada Brener
1960C: Alba Balocco
1961: Marta Buongiorno
1962: Ada Brener
1963: Marta Buongiorno
1964: Cristina Irurzun
1965: Emilia Dyrzka
1966: Liliana Cragno
1967: Cristina Filgueira
1968: Lidia Potocki
1969: Susana Acatto
1970: Cristina Filgueira
1971: Ángela Godoy
1972: Liliana Cragno
1973: Beatriz Allocco
1974: Belkis Fava
1975: Beatriz Allocco
1976: Beatriz Allocco
1977: Beatriz Allocco
1978: Beatriz Allocco
1979: Belkis Fava
1980: Beatriz Capotosto
1981: Susana Jenkins
1982: Adriana Pero
1983: Andrea Barabino
1984: Graciela Palacín
1985: Graciela Palacín
1986: Olga Conte
1987: Deborah Bell
1988: Olga Conte
1989: Olga Conte
1990: Ana María Comaschi
1991: Denise Sharpe
1992: Olga Conte
1993: Daniela Lebreo
1994: Daniela Lebreo
1995: Olga Conte
1996: Olga Conte
1997: Olga Conte
1998: Olga Conte
1999: Vanesa Wohlgemuth
2000: Vanesa Wohlgemuth
2001: Vanesa Wohlgemuth
2002: Vanesa Wohlgemuth
2003: Daniela Lebreo
2004: Vanesa Wohlgemuth
2005: Vanesa Wohlgemuth
2006: Liliana Tantucci

400 metres
1969: Cristina Filgueira
1970: Cristina Filgueira
1971: Cristina Filgueira
1972: Cristina Irurzun
1973: Graciela Ghelfi
1974: Graciela Ghelfi
1975: Graciela Ghelfi
1976: Sonia Nerpiti
1977: Marcela López Espinosa
1978: María Elviva Fernández
1979: Marcela López Espinosa
1980: Silvia Augsburger
1981: Silvia Augsburger
1982: Marcela López Espinosa
1983: Andrea Fuchs
1984: María Elena Croatto
1985: María Elena Croatto
1986: 
1987: Olga Conte
1988: Olga Conte
1989: Olga Conte
1990: Milagros Allende
1991: Patricia Oroño
1992: Anabella von Kesselstatt
1993: Ana María Comaschi
1994: Ana María Comaschi
1995: Olga Conte
1996: Olga Conte
1997: Olga Conte
1998: Marina Arias
1999: Andrea Rossotti
2000: Andrea Rossotti
2001: Cristina Ferrarini
2002: Anabella von Kesselstatt
2003: Andrea Rossotti
2004: Anabella von Kesselstatt
2005: Andrea Rossotti
2006: María Maldonado

800 metres
1968: Alicia Enríquez
1969: Iris Fernández
1970: Iris Fernández
1971: Iris Fernández
1972: Iris Fernández
1973: Cristina Sinitsch
1974: Cristina Sinitsch
1975: Ana María Nielsen
1976: Silvia Augsburger
1977: Marcela López Espinosa
1978: Marcela López Espinosa
1979: Marcela López Espinosa
1980: Silvia Augsburger
1981: Silvia Augsburger
1982: Silvia Augsburger
1983: Marta Ressia
1984: Liliana Mariel Góngora
1985: Liliana Mariel Góngora
1986: 
1987: Viviana Cortés
1988: Mabel Arrúa
1989: Mabel Arrúa
1990: Mabel Arrúa
1991: Paula Val
1992: Paula Val
1993: Alejandra Cepeda
1994: Marta Orellana
1995: Marta Orellana
1996: Marta Orellana
1997: Paula Tello Alonso
1998: María Peralta
1999: María Peralta
2000: María Peralta
2001: Laura Garciarena
2002: Valeria Rodríguez
2003: Andrea Rossotti
2004: Andrea Rossotti
2005: Andrea Rossotti
2006: María Peralta

1500 metres
1970: Iris Fernández
1971: Iris Fernández
1972: Iris Fernández
1973: Cristina Sinitsch
1974: Cristina Sinitsch
1975: Ana María Nielsen
1976: Silvia Augsburger
1977: Sonia Molina
1978: Ana María Nielsen
1979: Sonia Molina
1980: Sonia Molina
1981: Liliana Mariel Góngora
1982: Liliana Mariel Góngora
1983: Liliana Mariel Góngora
1984: Liliana Mariel Góngora
1985: Liliana Mariel Góngora
1986: Liliana Mariel Góngora
1987: Nora Wiedemer
1988: Mabel Arrúa
1989: Mabel Arrúa
1990: Mabel Arrúa
1991: Paula Val
1992: Paula Val
1993: Marta Orellana
1994: Miriam Ríos
1995: Marta Orellana
1996: Marta Orellana
1997: Elisa Cobañea
1998: María Peralta
1999: María Peralta
2000: María Peralta
2001: Valeria Rodríguez
2002: Valeria Rodríguez
2003: Natalia Siviero
2004: María Peralta
2005: Valeria Rodríguez
2006: María Peralta

3000 metres
1977: Iris Fernández
1978: Olga Caccaviello
1979: Olga Caccaviello
1980: Olga Caccaviello
1981: Olga Caccaviello
1982: Olga Caccaviello
1983: María Gazaza
1984: Margot Vargas
1985: María Victoria Biondi
1986: Adriana Calvo
1987: Elisa Cobañea
1988: Stella Maris Selles
1989: Norma Fernández
1990: Elisa Cobañea
1991: María Inés Rodríguez
1992: Virginia Fuente
1993: Miriam Ríos

5000 metres
1983: Sonia Molina
1984: Margot Vargas
1985: Olga Caccaviello
1986: Not held
1987: Not held
1988: Not held
1989: Not held
1990: Not held
1991: Not held
1992: Not held
1993: Not held
1994: María Inés Rodríguez
1995: Elisa Cobañea
1996: María Inés Rodríguez
1997: Elisa Cobañea
1998: Lelys Salazar
1999: Claudia Camargo
2000: Nadia Rodríguez
2001: Valeria Rodríguez
2002: Claudia Camargo
2003: Karina Córdoba
2004: Karina Córdoba
2005: Sandra Amarillo
2006: Karina Córdoba

10,000 metres
1986: Elisa Cobañea
1987: Elisa Cobañea
1988: Stella Maris Selles
1989: Adriana Calvo
1990: Elisa Cobañea
1991: María Inés Rodríguez
1992: Marta Orellana
1993: Vilma Pailos
1994: Elisa Cobañea
1995: Adriana Calvo
1996: Vilma Pailos
1997: Mónica Cervera
1998: Marcela Araújo
1999: Sandra Torres Álvarez
2000: Claudia Camargo
2001: Estela Martínez
2002: Estela Martínez
2003: Sandra Torres Álvarez
2004: Roxana Preussler
2005: Roxana Preussler
2006: Sandra Torres Álvarez

7K run
1989: Stella Maris Selles

15K run
The 1990 race was held on a short course.
1990: María Inés Rodríguez
1991: Zulma Ortiz

Half marathon
The 1995 race was held on a short course
1983: Iris Fernández
1984: Stella Maris Selles
1985: Graciela Bargas
1986: Stella Maris Selles
1987: Griselda González
1988: Agueda Di Gregorio
1989: Not held
1990: Not held
1991: Not held
1992: Possibly not held
1993: Possibly not held
1994: Norma Quevedo
1995: Verónica Páez
1996: Verónica Páez
1997: Adriana Calvo
1998: Lelys Salazar
1999: Mónica Cervera
2000: Elisa Cobañea
2001: Elisa Cobañea
2002: Sandra Torres Álvarez
2003: Verónica Páez
2004: Carina Allay
2005: Carina Allay

Marathon
1988: Ethel Bárzola
1989: Mirta Febles
1990: Gloria Vera
1991: Nélida de Farías
1992: Mirta Febles
1993: Mirta Navea
1994: Neilida Olivet
1995: María Teresa Aguerre
1996: María Inés Rodríguez
1997: Griselda González
1998: Mónica Cervera
1999: Sandra Torres Álvarez
2000: Claudia Camargo
2001: Sandra Torres Álvarez
2002: Adriana Calvo
2003: Verónica Páez
2004: Sandra Torres Álvarez
2005: Verónica Páez

3000 metres steeplechase
1999: Verónica Páez
2000: Verónica Páez
2001: Claudia Camargo
2002: Claudia Camargo
2003: María Peralta
2004: Rosa Godoy
2005: María Peralta
2006: Rosa Godoy

80 metres hurdles
1960F: Ada Brener
1960C: Marta Santine
1961: Graciela Paviotti
1962: Emilia Dyrzka
1963: Graciela Paviotti
1964: Emilia Dyrzka
1965: Emilia Dyrzka
1966: Ana María Michelini
1967: Graciela Paviotti
1968: Liliana Cragno

100 metres hurdles
1969: Alicia Cantarini
1970: Alicia Cantarini
1971: Emilia Dyrzka
1972: Lelia Scipioni
1973: Emilia Dyrzka
1974: Mónica Rodríguez
1975: Inés Jerabek
1976: Susana Planas
1977: Yvonne Neddermann
1978: Beatriz Capotosto
1979: Inés Jerabek
1980: Beatriz Capotosto
1981: Beatriz Capotosto
1982: Beatriz Capotosto
1983: Beatriz Capotosto
1984: Adriana Sandes
1985: Beatriz Capotosto
1986: Graciela Pugliese
1987: Beatriz Capotosto
1988: Liliana Derfler
1989: Beatriz Capotosto
1990: Ana María Comaschi
1991: Anabella von Kesselstatt
1992: Ana María Comaschi
1993: Verónica Depaoli
1994: Verónica Depaoli
1995: Alejandra García
1996: Alejandra García
1997: Verónica Depaoli
1998: Verónica Depaoli
1999: Verónica Depaoli
2000: Verónica Depaoli
2001: Verónica Depaoli
2002: Anabella von Kesselstatt
2003: María Azzato
2004: Alejandra Llorente
2005: María Azzato
2006: María Azzato

400 metres hurdles
1977: Silvia Morandi
1978: Anabella Dal Lago
1979: Gladys Gandulfo
1980: Gladys Gandulfo
1981: Anabella Dal Lago
1982: Mariana Pösz
1983: Anabella Dal Lago
1984: Laura Arriarán
1985: Ana María Comaschi
1986: Ana Laura Paz
1987: Paula Val
1988: Paula Val
1989: Anabella von Kesselstatt
1990: Anabella von Kesselstatt
1991: Anabella von Kesselstatt
1992: Anabella von Kesselstatt
1993: Verónica Depaoli
1994: Sandra Izquierdo
1995: Sandra Izquierdo
1996: Verónica Depaoli
1997: Verónica Depaoli
1998: Verónica Depaoli
1999: Cora Olivero
2000: Verónica Depaoli
2001: Cristina Ferrarini
2002: Anabella von Kesselstatt
2003: Verónica Barraza
2004: Anabella von Kesselstatt
2005: Verónica Barraza
2006: Soledad Bellucci

High jump
1960F: Ana Erb
1960C: Marta Millán
1961: Graciela Paviotti
1962: Isabel Ramírez
1963: Graciela Paviotti
1964: Isabel Ramírez
1965: Mabel Farina
1966: Lila Negro
1967: Lila Negro
1968: Ana María Estrada
1969: Lila Negro
1970: Ana María Estrada
1971: Lila Negro
1972: Mónica Rodríguez
1973: Ana María Estrada
1974: Norma Rogatky
1975: Roxana Pereña
1976: Diana Celeiro
1977: Roxana Pereña
1978: not contested
1979: Liliana Arigoni
1980: Mónica Halporn
1981: Liliana Arigoni & Mónica Halporn
1982: Diana Picabea
1983: Liliana Arigoni
1984: Ana María Olivar
1985: Ana María Olivar
1986: Nancy Piva
1987: Nancy Piva
1988: Liliana Derfler
1989: Andrea Ávila
1990: Liliana Derfler
1991: Liliana Derfler
1992: Alejandra García
1993: Solange Witteveen
1994: Mariela Andrade
1995: Solange Witteveen
1996: Alejandra García
1997: Solange Witteveen
1998: Delfina Blaquier
1999: Solange Witteveen
2000: Ana Berg
2001: Solange Witteveen
2002: Claudia Casals
2003: Claudia Casals
2004: Solange Witteveen
2005: Solange Witteveen
2006: Daniela Crespo

Pole vault
1994: Mariana Falcioni
1995: Alejandra García
1996: Alejandra García
1997: Alejandra García
1998: Alejandra García
1999: Alejandra García
2000: Alejandra García
2001: Alejandra García
2002: Alejandra García
2003: Alejandra García
2004: Alejandra García
2005: Alejandra García
2006: Carolina Dalurzo

Long jump
1960F: Ada Brener
1960C: Possibly not held
1961: Graciela Paviotti
1962: Alicia Kaufmanas
1963: Possibly not held
1964: Cristina Irurzun
1965: Alicia Kaufmanas
1966: Alicia Kaufmanas
1967: Alicia Kaufmanas
1968: Alicia Kaufmanas
1969: Alicia Kaufmanas
1970: Matilde Pablo
1971: Ana Clara Goldman
1972: Lelia Scipioni
1973: Lelia Scipioni
1974: Norma Rogatky
1975: Christa Sommersguter
1976: Yvonne Neddermann
1977: Yvonne Neddermann
1978: Yvonne Neddermann
1979: Araceli Bruschini
1980: Laura Rivarola
1981: Araceli Bruschini
1982: Araceli Bruschini
1983: Liliana Derfler
1984: Zoraya Rodríguez
1985: Silvia Murialdo
1986: Ana Martina Vizioli
1987: Andrea Ávila
1988: Ana Martina Vizioli
1989: Andrea Ávila
1990: Andrea Ávila
1991: Sandra Izquierdo
1992: Andrea Ávila
1993: Andrea Ávila
1994: Andrea Ávila
1995: Alejandra García
1996: Alejandra García
1997: Andrea Ávila
1998: Andrea Ávila
1999: Andrea Ávila
2000: Andrea Ávila
2001: Andrea Ávila
2002: Soledad Donzino
2003: Andrea Morales
2004: Alejandra Llorente
2005: Andrea Bordalejo
2006: Andrea Bordalejo

Triple jump
1990: Andrea Ávila
1991: Liliana Derfler
1992: Andrea Ávila
1993: Andrea Ávila
1994: Andrea Ávila
1995: Solange Witteveen
1996: Leticia Solari
1997: Andrea Ávila
1998: Andrea Ávila
1999: Andrea Ávila
2000: Andrea Ávila
2001: Andrea Ávila
2002: Valeria Soplanes
2003: 
2004: Nathalie Patiño
2005: 
2006: Verónica Desimoni

Shot put
1960F: Ingeborg Pfüller
1960C: Yolanda Rey
1961: Ingeborg Pfüller
1962: Ingeborg Mello
1963: Ingeborg Pfüller
1964: Norma Suárez
1965: Norma Suárez
1966: Norma Suárez
1967: Emilia Dyrzka
1968: Gladys Ortega
1969: Ana Julieta Scursoni
1970: Gladys Ortega
1971: Sofía Módica
1972: Sofía Módica
1973: Patricia Weber
1974: Ramona Brizuela
1975: Patricia Weber
1976: Ramona Brizuela
1977: Patricia Weber
1978: Patricia Weber
1979: Alejandra Bevacqua
1980: Alejandra Bevacqua
1981: Alejandra Bevacqua
1982: Susana Diez
1983: Alejandra González
1984: Diana Dutczyn
1985: 
1986: 
1987: 
1988: 
1989: Ana María Comaschi
1990: Silvana Filippi
1991: 
1992: Silvana Filippi
1993: Silvana Filippi
1994: Ana Carolina Vera
1995: Simone Pereira Gonçalves BRA
1996: Simone Pereira Gonçalves BRA
1997: Simone Pereira Gonçalves BRA
1998: Simone Pereira Gonçalves BRA
1999: Simone Pereira Gonçalves BRA
2000: Simone Pereira Gonçalves BRA
2001: Paola Cheppi
2002: Natalia Ortiz
2003: Paola Cheppi
2004: Paola Cheppi
2005: Rocío Comba
2006: Rocío Comba

Discus throw
1960F: Ingeborg Pfüller
1960C: Dora López
1961: Ingeborg Pfüller
1962: Ingeborg Pfüller
1963: Ingeborg Pfüller
1964: Inés Nieto
1965: María Amaizón
1966: Inés Nieto
1967: Inés Nieto
1968: Gladys Ortega
1969: Gladys Ortega
1970: Gladys Ortega
1971: Gladys Ortega
1972: Clara Suárez
1973: Mirtha Salas
1974: Gladys Ortega
1975: Gladys Ortega
1976: María Rescia
1977: Gladys Ortega
1978: not contested
1979: Ana Adorno
1980: Alejandra Bevacqua
1981: Elizabeth Martínez
1982: Susana Diez
1983: Elizabeth Martínez
1984: Elizabeth Martínez
1985: Daphne Birnios
1986: Liliana Olguín
1987: Liliana Olguín
1988: Daphne Birnios
1989: Liliana Martinelli
1990: Liliana Martinelli
1991: Silvana Filippi
1992: Liliana Martinelli
1993: Liliana Martinelli
1994: Liliana Martinelli
1995: Liliana Martinelli
1996: Liliana Martinelli
1997: Liliana Martinelli
1998: María Eugenia Giggi
1999: Liliana Martinelli
2000: María Eugenia Giggi
2001: María Eugenia Giggi
2002: Natalia Ortiz
2003: Natalia Ortiz
2004: Claudia Ullmann
2005: Rocío Comba
2006: Rocío Comba

Hammer throw
1990: Zulma Lambert
1991: Zulma Lambert
1992: Zulma Lambert
1993: Zulma Lambert
1994: Zulma Lambert
1995: Karina Moya
1996: Karina Moya
1997: Karina Moya
1998: Karina Moya
1999: Karina Moya
2000: Karina Moya
2001: Karina Moya
2002: Zulma Lambert
2003: Karina Moya
2004: Karina Moya
2005: Karina Moya
2006: Karina Moya

Javelin throw
1960F: Magdalena García
1960C: Patricia Arepia
1961: Magdalena García
1962: Magdalena García
1963: Patricia Arepia
1964: Vilma Totaro
1965: Vilma Totaro
1966: Marta Occhi
1967: Magdalena García
1968: Vilma Totaro
1969: Ana María Campillay
1970: Ana María Campillay
1971: Ana Julieta Scursoni
1972: Ana María Campillay
1973: Ana María Campillay
1974: María Gauna
1975: Susana Sánchez
1976: Ana María Campillay
1977: Ana María Campillay
1978: Ana María Campillay
1979: Ana María Campillay
1980: Ana María Campillay
1981: Ana María Campillay
1982: Ana María Campillay
1983: Patricia Echague
1984: Ana María Campillay
1985: Sonia Favre
1986: Ana María Campillay
1987: Ana María Campillay
1988: Sonia Favre
1989: Sonia Favre
1990: Sonia Favre
1991: Sonia Favre
1992: Mariela Arch
1993: Mariela Arch
1994: Silvina Médici
1995: Silvina Médici
1996: Romina Maggi
1997: Romina Maggi
1998: Mariela Arch
1999: Romina Maggi
2000: Romina Maggi
2001: Romina Maggi
2002: Romina Maggi
2003: Romina Maggi
2004: Romina Maggi
2005: Romina Maggi
2006: Romina Maggi

Pentathlon
1972: Ana Clara Goldman
1973: Emilia Dyrzka
1974: Inés Jerabek
1975: Inés Jerabek
1976: Yvonne Neddermann
1977: Yvonne Neddermann
1978: Yvonne Neddermann
1979: Inés Jerabek
1980: Ana Urbano

Heptathlon
1981: Ana María Comaschi
1982: Ana María Comaschi
1983: Ana Destéfanis
1984: Ana Urbano
1985: Ana Destéfanis
1986: Possibly not held
1987: Ana María Comaschi
1988: Ana María Comaschi
1989: Ana María Comaschi
1990: Alejandra García
1991: Carolina Gutiérrez
1992: Mariela Andrade
1993: Mariela Andrade
1994: not contested
1995: Silvina Boretto
1996: Agustina López
1997: Verónica Domínguez
1998: María Fernanda Dilascio
1999: Andrea Bordalejo
2000: Ana Berg
2001: María Cecilia Marcobechio
2002: Anabella von Kesselstatt
2003: Daniela Crespo
2004: María Azzato
2005: Andrea Bordalejo
2006: Andrea Bordalejo

10,000 metres walk
The 1996 race was held as a road event.
1986: Ofelia Puyol
1987: Mirta Casal
1988: Mirta Casal
1989: Lidia Carriego
1990: Lidia Carriego
1991: Lidia Carriego
1992: Graciela Maidana
1993: Lidia Carriego
1994: Lidia Carriego
1995: Lidia Carriego
1996: Andrea Dell'Isola
1997: Lidia Carriego
1998: Lidia Carriego

20,000 metres walk
1999: Ofelia Puyol
2000: Ofelia Puyol
2001: Not held
2002: Not held
2003: Lidia Carriego

20 kilometres walk
2001: Gladys Gibert
2002: Lidia Carriego
2003: Lidia Carriego
2004: Lidia Carriego
2005: Lidia Carriego
2006: Lidia Carriego

Cross country (long course)
1980: Olga Caccaviello
1981: Olga Caccaviello
1982: Olga Caccaviello
1983: Sonia Molina
1984: Sonia Molina
1985: Graciela Bargas
1986: Olga Caccaviello
1987: Norma Fernández
1988: Stella Maris Selles
1989: Griselda González
1990: Valeria Martínez
1991: Beatriz Coronel
1992: María Inés Rodríguez
1993: María Inés Rodríguez
1994: Elisa Cobañea
1995: María Inés Rodríguez
1996: Verónica Páez
1997: Lelys Salazar
1998: Lelys Salazar
1999: Verónica Ortega
2000: Verónica Páez
2001: Valeria Rodríguez
2002: Norma Garay
2003: Sandra Torres Álvarez
2004: Nadia Rodríguez
2005: Valeria Rodríguez

Cross country (short course)
1999: Nélida Vivas
2000: Claudia Camargo
2001: María Peralta
2002: Karina Córdoba
2003: María Peralta
2004: Sandra Amarillo
2005: María Peralta

References

Champions 1960–2006
Argentinian Championships. GBR Athletics. Retrieved 2021-02-12.

Winners
 List
Argentine Championships
Athletics